The Trail of Time may refer to:
The Trail of Time, the bonus round from the educational game show Where in Time Is Carmen Sandiego?
Trail of Time, an outdoor geology exhibit and nature trail on the South Rim of Grand Canyon National Park